Jens Winther (born 25 December 1938 in Roskilde) is a Danish former racing driver.

References

1938 births
Living people
Danish racing drivers
24 Hours of Le Mans drivers
World Sportscar Championship drivers
World Touring Car Championship drivers
People from Roskilde
Sportspeople from Region Zealand
20th-century Danish people